Valley City may refer to:

a place in the United States:
Valley City, Illinois
Valley City, Indiana
Valley City, Missouri
Valley City, North Dakota
Valley City, Ohio
Valley City Public School District
Valley City Wetland Management District
West Valley City, Utah

a university
Valley City State University

a newspaper
Valley City Times-Record

or
USS Valley City (1859), a 190-ton steamer used by the Union Navy during the American Civil War.